The De La Salle Canlubang, currently the De La Salle University – Laguna Campus, was a private Catholic basic and higher education institution and a member institution of De La Salle Philippines run by the Institute of the Brothers of the Christian Schools in Biñan, Laguna, Philippines. It is located right across the Laguna Technopark district. The campus, which was acquired on 2003, is a  prime property. Part of this property was donated by the family of the late National Artist for Architecture Leandro Locsin (DLSU HS 1947).

In 2012, the administrators of De La Salle University- Manila and De La Salle Canlubang approved the integration of DLSC to DLSU, becoming the DLSU Science & Technology Complex or DLSU Leandro V. Locsin Campus, then later renamed to De La Salle University – Laguna Campus.

History

The Brothers of the Christian Schools, officially known as Fratres Scholarum Christianarum or FSC, is a congregation dedicated to the teachings espoused by Saint Jean Baptiste de La Salle.

The first De La Salle School in the Philippines was opened on June 16, 1911, along General Luna, Paco, Manila at the request of the Archbishop of Manila. In 1921, the school was moved to its present site on Taft Avenue. Unable to accommodate requests for admission  to the elementary grades, they had to revert an earlier policy not to expand. To date, they have spread out to different provinces. The  Brothers have since opened in Greenhills, Antipolo, Lipa, Bacolod, Iligan, Dasmarinas, and Alabang. They have also undertaken supervision of some schools in Manila, Cavite, Bataan, Cebu, Bukidnon, Surigao del Sur, Negros Occidental, Masbate, Capiz, and Ozamis. Today they are known as De La Salle Supervised Schools.

Around 1977, the idea of having another La Salle School, this time in the Laguna area was conceptualized. This was when Architect Lindy Locsin, then a member of Manila's De La Salle University (DLSU) board of Trustees, offered to donate several hectares of his family's land to La Salle. In 1997, this generous donation of the Locsins was realized. La Salle purchased additional contiguous lands making De La Salle Canlubang a sprawling fifty-hectare campus.

Laguna is fast becoming the country's industrial and technological site. Its large, industrial companies presently make it the home of the first Science Technological Park. In response to the ever-quickening pace of scientific and technological development of modern times, the concept of a three-level science and technology oriented school took root. Hence, De La Salle Canlubang (DLSC) was established in June 2003 in order to address the educational concerns of our nation with its youth as its strength. They are envisioned to be grounded on science and technological skills cloaked in the ideals of St. La Salle as an answer to the demands and challenges of the 21st century.

The Integrated school opened its doors to 240 students from preschool to grade 4 and grade 8 (second year high school) during its first year. The curriculum adapts to the science education as its basis. Science emphasizes hands-on exploration and direct experience with the natural world; thereby producing young scientists who are well-rounded and whose strength include: science and technological skills, clear-analytical thinking, and scientific literacy, to be active members of society.

After DLSC was integrated into DLSU to become De La Salle University Science and Technology Complex (DLSU -STC) in 2012, its Integrated School has grown to be one of the most progressive educational institutions south of Metro Manila with a population of more than 1,000 students from Kinder 1 to Grade 12 geared towards producing lifelong learners with the spirit of Faith, Service and Communion and equipped to meet the challenges of the new 2000 millennium. The campus was later renamed De La Salle University - Laguna Campus.

Campus

Milagros R. del Rosario Building
The first building to be constructed on campus is the four-storey Milagros V. del Rosario Building, which houses the school's administrative offices and classrooms. The building was donated to the school by Ambassador Ramon V. del Rosario. The building has 35 classrooms, a 200-seat auditorium, three audio-visual rooms, three libraries, a media lab, a dark room for the photography students, a radio station, a children's playroom, a robotics classroom, and three computer laboratories. Construction began in April 2002 and was completed in June 2003 and was designed by the firm L.V. Locsin and Partners.

Integrated School Building
Beginning construction in August 2005, the Integrated School building was finished in March 2006, right on time for the following academic year. The IS Building houses the classrooms and other spaces for the Nursery students of the Integrated School. The building used to have a canteen of its own near the Pergola, but now it is where the LC1 clinic is.

Pergola
The Pergola is a multi-purpose hall for the students. It stands beside the new Integrated School Building. It is used for the weekly prayers (Every 1st Monday of each month), it also is where some of the sports activities are held in the annual Sports Fest.

Learning Center 1 (LC1) 
It houses the classrooms for Preschool, Kindergarten, Elementary school (Grades 1–4). Also considered to be part of LC1, LC1 Annex or more commonly Annex is where the Student Discipline and Formations Office or SDFO is.

References

External links
Official Website of De La Salle Canlubang

Canlubang
Universities and colleges in Laguna (province)
Educational institutions established in 2003
Education in Biñan
Education in Santa Rosa, Laguna
2003 establishments in the Philippines